Brice 3 is a 2016 French comedy film directed by James Huth and starring Jean Dujardin, Clovis Cornillac, Bruno Salomone and Alban Lenoir. It is the sequel to the 2005 film Brice de Nice, despite its name suggesting it is the third installment in the franchise.

Cast 
 Jean Dujardin as Brice Agostini (Brice de Nice) 
 Clovis Cornillac as Marius 
 Bruno Salomone as Igor
 Alban Lenoir as Gregor
 Noëlle Perna as Edwige
 Jean-Michel Lahmi as Le chargé de mission
 Gaston Le Poisson as Fabrice Le Fish
 Louis-Do de Lencquesaing as Dr. Louis-Do de Bordeaux
 Katrina Grey as Braïce Kisseuse

Release 
Brice 3 was released in France on 19 October 2016 in 630 theatres. It opened to number one in its debut week, with 1,100,295 entries.

References

External links 
 

2016 films
2016 comedy films
2010s French-language films
French comedy films
Surfing films
Films set in Hawaii
Gaumont Film Company films
Films directed by James Huth
French sequel films
Films scored by Bruno Coulais
2010s French films